Anzali may refer to:

 Anzali (dance), an Azerbaijani melody of a dance which was created between 1880 and 1890.
 Bandar-e Anzali, a harbor city by the Caspian Sea in the Gilan Province of Iran